John Ching Hsiung Wu (also John C.H. Wu; Traditional Chinese: 吳經熊; pinyin: Wu Jingxiong) (born 28 March 1899, Ningbo – 6 February 1986) was a Chinese jurist and author. He wrote works in Chinese, English, French, and German on Christian spirituality, Chinese literature (including a translation of the Tao Te Ching) and on legal topics. On his Tao Te Ching translation, Thomas Merton said Wu's work was "absolutely necessary for us not only to progress but even to survive."

Biography 
A graduate of the University of Michigan Law School, he was the principal author of the constitution of the Republic of China.  He maintained a correspondence with U.S. Supreme Court Justice Oliver Wendell Holmes Jr. and later produced scholarly work examining Holmes' legal thought. Previously a Methodist, he was a convert to Roman Catholicism after reading Thérèse of Lisieux's biography.  

Wu served as an adviser in the Chinese delegation to the 1945 United Nations Conference on International Organization in San Francisco and served as the Chinese ambassador to the Vatican in 1947-49. In 1957, Wu was appointed a judge of the Permanent Court of Arbitration in the Hague.  After the Chinese Communist Revolution, Wu worked as a professor at the Seton Hall University School of Law in New Jersey until retiring to Taiwan in 1967.

Works by John C. H. Wu
Juridical Essays and Studies (Shanghai, China: Commercial Press, 1928) (Shanghai, China: Commercial Press, 1933)
Some Unpublished Letters of Justice Holmes ([Shanghai, China]: s.n., 1935)
The Art of Law and Other Essays Juridical and Literary (Shanghai: Commercial Press, 1936)
Essays in Jurisprudence and Legal Philosophy ([Shanghai]: Soochow University Law School, 1938) (1981)
The Science of Love: A Study in the Teachings of Thérèse of Lisieux (Huntington, Indiana: Our Sunday Visitor Press, 1941)(Hong Kong: Catholic Truth Society, 1941)
Justice Holmes to Doctor Wu: An Intimate Correspondence 1921-1932 (New York: Central Book Co., 1947)
From Confucianism to Catholicism (Huntingdon, Indiana: Our Sunday Visitor Press, 1949)
Beyond East and West (New York: Sheed and Ward, 1951) (Taipei: Mei Ya Publications, 1951) (New York: Sheed and Ward, 1952) (Taipei: Mei Ya Publications, 1969) (Beijing: She hui ke xue wen xian chu ban she, 2002)
The Interior Carmel: The Threefold Way of Love (London: Sheed & Ward, 1954) (Taipei, Taiwan: Hwakang Bookstore, 1975)
Fountain of Justice: A Study in Natural Law (New York; Sheed and Ward, 1955)(London: Sheed and Ward, 1959)(Taipei: Mei Ya Publications, 1971)
Justice Holmes: A New Estimate (Philadelphia: Brandeis Lawyers Society, 1957)
Cases and Materials on Jurisprudence (St. Paul, Minnesota: West Publishing Co., 1958)
Chinese Humanism and Christian spirituality (Jamaica, New York: St. John's University Press, 1965)
Sun Yat-sen: The Man and His Ideas (Taipei: Published for Sun Yat-sen Cultural Foundation by the Commercial Press, 1971)
The Four Seasons of T`ang Poetry (Rutland, Vermont: C.E. Tuttle Co., 1972) 
Zhongguo zhe hsuëh [Chinese philosophy] (Taipei, Taiwan: China Academy, 1974)
The Golden Age of Zen (Taipei, Taiwan: United Publishing Center, 1975) (Taipei: Hua kang ch`u pan yu hsien kung ssu / tsung ching hsiao Hua kang shu ch`eng, 1975) (New York: Doubleday, 1996. )
Tao Teh Ching (translation) (New York: St. John's University Press, 1961) [Dao  jing (New York: Barnes & Noble, 1997)] (Boston: Shambhala, 2003)
"Chinese Legal and political Philosophy," [pp. 213–237] in The Chinese Mind: Essentials of Chinese Philosophy and Culture, ed. Charles A. Moore (Honolulu: East-West Center Press, 1967)

Notes

References

External links

Papers of John C. H. Wu, MSS 122, Seton Hall University.
 

Republic of China poets
Chinese jurists
Roman Catholic writers
Chinese Roman Catholics
Converts to Roman Catholicism
1899 births
1986 deaths
Ambassadors of the Republic of China
Taiwanese poets
Writers from Ningbo
University of Michigan Law School alumni
Poets from Zhejiang
Chinese spiritual writers
20th-century Taiwanese poets
Ambassadors of China to the Holy See
Tianjin University alumni
University of Shanghai alumni
Soochow University (Suzhou) alumni